Becklesius is an extinct genus of Paramacellodid lizard known from the Late Jurassic to Late Cretaceous of Europe, the type species, B. hoffstetteri is known from Kimmeridgian aged sediments of the Alcobaça Formation in Portugal. An indeterminate species is known from Berriasian aged sediments of the Lulworth Formation in the UK. Another species B. cataphractus is known the Barremian aged sediments of the Una locality, part of the La Huérguina Formation, Spain. A third species, B. nopcsai is known from the Late Cretaceous (Maastrichtian) Sânpetru Formation of Romania.

References

Early Cretaceous reptiles of Europe
Late Jurassic reptiles of Europe
Jurassic lizards
Cretaceous lizards
Cretaceous Spain
Fossils of Spain
La Huérguina Formation